BlueNext was a European environmental trading exchange, considered the largest CO2 permit spot market, with headquarters in Paris, France. On October 26, 2012, BlueNext announced that it would close permanently its spot and derivatives trading operations as of December 5, 2012.

Overview 
BlueNext was founded in December 2007 when NYSE Euronext and Caisse des Dépôts purchased the carbon market from PowerNext. 
NYSE Euronext holds a 60 percent majority stake in BlueNext and Caisse des Dépôts owns the other 40 percent. PowerNext continues to operate its electricity market separately.

Members of BlueNext are offered spot trading of carbon (CO2) emission rights and derivative products (futures) on European Union Allowances (EUAs) and Certified Emission Reductions (CERs). LCH.Clearnet SA provides clearing services for BlueNext futures EUA and BlueNext futures CER.

As an expansion to their existing products and services, BlueNext began offering auction services, and as a result of strategic partnership with Markit issued their first index, the Markit BlueNext EUA Spot Index.

NYSE Blue 
NYSE Euronext and APX announced on September 7, 2010 plans for a join venture, NYSE Blue, that will focus exclusively on environmental and sustainable energy markets, and expansion of these services in North America and Asia. NYSE Euronext will contribute its ownership in BlueNext in return for a majority interest in the joint venture, while APX will contribute its business (operational, regulatory infrastructure and services for the environmental and sustainable energy markets) in return for a minority interest in the venture.

China 
China is the world’s leading source of greenhouse gases and is identified as the source of more than 80 percent of carbon credits traded globally. In June 2009, BlueNext and the China Beijing Environmental Exchange (CBEEX) signed an agreement to set up an international carbon-trading related information platform that would jointly publish and promote Clean Development Mechanism (CDM) projects based in China. This information is to be sourced from the China Beijing Environmental Exchange.

The second joint project between BlueNext and CBEEX is the Panda Standard – the first voluntary standard designed specifically for China and the Chinese carbon marketplace, with an initial primary focus on agriculture and forestry.

United States 
BlueNext announced its intention to extend its presence into the United States. The company is currently going through a period of study and research to design products for this North American market.

Main competitors 
 European Climate Exchange
 NASDAQ OMX Commodities Europe
 European Energy Exchange
 Green Exchange

See also 

 Carbon credit
 Carbon offset
 Emissions trading
 Kyoto Protocol
 List of futures exchanges

References

External links
 BlueNext official website
 Panda Standard website
 APX, Inc.
 NYSE Blue FAQs

Financial services companies established in 2007
Energy exchanges in Europe
NYSE Euronext
Energy in France
Companies based in Paris
Commodity exchanges in France